Mannar Island Lighthouse is a lighthouse in Urumalai on Mannar Island in northern Sri Lanka. The inactive lighthouse is an iron structure.

See also
 List of lighthouses in Sri Lanka

References

Lighthouses completed in 1915
Lighthouses in Sri Lanka
Archaeological protected monuments in Mannar District
Buildings and structures in Mannar District